Arviat South (Inuinnaqtun: Arviat Hivuraa) is an electoral district (riding) for the Legislative Assembly of Nunavut, Canada.

The riding consists of part of the community of Arviat. The district was created prior to the 28 October 2013 general election. The community was previously in Arviat.

Arviat South MLA Joe Savikataaq, who was Deputy Premier of Nunavut following the October 30, 2017 election, became Premier after Paul Quassa was removed from his position after a vote of no-confidence.

Election results

2021 election

2017 election

2013 election

References

Electoral districts of Kivalliq Region
2013 establishments in Nunavut